Richard Alfred Dunn  (1920–2006)  was an Australian rugby league footballer and coach in the New South Wales Rugby Football League premiership (NSWRFL).

Playing career
Dunn played 148 matches for the Eastern Suburbs club in the years (1938–47). A local junior of that club, Dunn grew up idolising the senior players, carrying the kit bags of legends like Dave Brown and Ray Stehr; a few years later he was playing alongside of them. Dunn played in four premiership deciders in his career, winning in 1940 and 1945.

Dunn is best remembered for the 1945 Grand Final in which he scored 19 of East's 22 points, a record that still stands today for the most points scored in a premiership decider. In an interview with Sean Fagan, Dunn recalls the final minutes of the match –

 “Yes well the situation was this, the game was very, very close. They led us 10 to 5 at half time and were playing a mighty game of  football. 
The scores and play fluctuated and they led us with about four minutes to go by 18 to 17. We got a penalty on the half way line and Ray Stehr [captain] says "kick for the sideline". Wally O'Connell, who played in the game will verify this of course, he was closest to me. Stehr says "which side you going to kick, so I'll go over?" I said "Don't you want the two points - it'll put us in front!" He said "Its too far for you to kick it." 
Anyway,  I had a little bit of trouble in getting the ball onto a mound. In those days there was no sand or anything like that to assist and I couldn't make a mound from the hardness of the centre, you know, the cricket pitch. So I said to Georgie Watt I'm going to kick this "Lomas style" - that's an upright position of the ball you know, standing up? He said "Oh you couldn't kick that Lomas style." 
And ah of course as soon as it left my boot, I thought this a goer for sure. Some say it landed in the crowd. I know it landed well over the bloody post because we did have a bit of excitement by kicking it - we were winning! 
Ironically, when Balmain kicked off I anticipated Jorgenson's kick - he was a great footballer and a great goal kicker, probably a lot better than me. I said to myself he'll kick this right here, which was the 25 yard line. But of course even with us having possession of the ball there could have been a scrum and something could have happened, maybe they could've kicked 2 points with a field goal and all that. 
Anyway, sure enough, I've caught the ball fortunately and this is the truth and actual facts - I punted it from our own 25 to find the line 5 yards from the corner post under the SCG scoreboard! Right? We won the scrum against the feed and this is where Lisle and O'Connell put a move on that, I'm not quite sure what the name of the move was, any rate, they went bang, bang, bang and fortunately they just passed me the ball and I scored in the corner and that really won the game. It was 22-18 with about 10 seconds to play.

Kicking for the conversion goal and I've always said it, people say "ah your bull!", I'm kicking for the goal and in my opinion no chance of missing. I had a lot of confidence and I went into the ball and just before I got into the ball the bell rang for full time you know. And it just put me off and grazed the outside upright so there was two more I would've scored!” .

Post playing
Following his retirement from the game as a player he became a prominent administrator, serving as vice president of the NSWRL and chairman of rugby league's judiciary panel. He was also the coach of Easts in 1960, losing to St George in that year's Grand Final. For his services, Dunn was made a life member of the Eastern Suburbs, the NSWRL and Australian Rugby League (ARL) and was a recipient of an Order of Australia O.A.M for his services to Rugby League. He was also coach of the New South Wales team in the 1960s. He was granted a life membership of Eastern Suburbs Rugby League, because as a director of the Eastern Suburbs Leagues Club, he was one of the original directors who negotiated the site of the present Rugby League club which had originally started when Dunn was the social secretary of Easts in the 1950s in two little rooms at the northern end of the promenade at Bondi Beach.  Later functions were held at the Bondi Pavilion and then at a hotel at Bondi Junction.  Eastern Suburbs Leagues Club had humble beginnings and if not for men like Dick Dunn and his fellow directors, like Bob Stuart and others, the "Roosters" or boys from Bondi as they are now known may never have had a club to celebrate their victories.

Dunn was also a sergeant in the Australian Imperial Force (AIF) stationed firstly at Scheyville NSW  as a searchlights operator and later in the Transport Corps near Newcastle.

He worked as manager of the Morley Johnson's store opposite Sydney Town Hall - whose motto was "everything for the home" from age 16. He met his wife Margaret at the store.  After Morley Johnsons closed its doors in the 1960s, Dunn worked for Miles Furniture and retired at 65 to spend more time with his beloved wife (who died in 1990).

At the time of his death in 2006, Dunn was age 86.

References

Footnotes
 Various yearbooks; David Middleton

External links
Dick Dunn at rl1908.com

1920 births
2006 deaths
Australian rugby league coaches
Australian rugby league players
New South Wales rugby league team coaches
Recipients of the Medal of the Order of Australia
Rugby league players from Sydney
Sydney Roosters coaches
Sydney Roosters players